TO-66 is a type of semiconductor package for devices with three connections, such as transistors. The shape is similar to the TO-3 package, but the size is smaller. The TO-66 package is made entirely of metal and is commonly used by silicon controlled rectifiers and power transistors.
In Europe, it was popularly used by the complementary germanium power transistors AD161/AD162.

Two pins on the other side of the plate are isolated from the package by individual glass-metal seals. The metal case forms the third connection (in the case of a bipolar junction transistor this is typically the collector).

Variants
TO-66 is often used as a synonym for any of the variants that have the same footprint (i.e. position of mounting holes and pins) as TO-66.

TO-123

TO-124

TO-213
TO-213 is intended to replace previous definitions of flange-mounted packages with a  pin spacing. The different outlines are now defined as variants of TO-213: TO-66 is renamed to TO-213-AA, TO-123 to TO-213-AB, TO-124 to TO-213-AC.

National standards

See also
 TO-126 - a plastic package with power ratings similar to TO-66

References

External links
 TO-66 Package, EESemi.com

Semiconductor packages